Tylihul is a river in the Odesa Oblast in southern Ukraine, 168 km long, up to 10–20 m wide, watershed is 3,550 km2. It has origin in the Podilian Upland and flows through narrow (1.0—1.5 km wide) valley to the Black Sea depression, where the valley is wider and has up to 3 km. The river inflows to the Tylihul Estuary.

The name of the river comes from the name of the water body into which it flows, the Tylihul Estuary, means 'mad, rabid lake'.

Rivers of Odesa Oblast